Adoor Prakash (born 24 May 1956) is an Indian politician from  Congress(I) party. He is currently the Member of Parliament, Lok Sabha, representing Attingal constituency of Kerala.

He was the Minister of Kerala, India. He has deep family roots in Moonnalam, Adoor. He came to active politics through the Student movement of Kerala Students Union. He was elected to the Kerala Legislative Assembly consecutively from Konni Constituency in 1996, 2001, 2006, 2011 and 2016 General Elections as a candidate of Indian National Congress. He served as the Minister of Health and Coir in the Oommen Chandy Ministry from 2011 to 2012. Later in the  cabinet reshuffle, he was  made the minister of land revenue in 2012. He was also the Minister of Food & Civil supplies in the first Oommen Chandy Ministry from 2004 to 2006. He was elected to the Loksabha from Attingal constituency in 2019.

Personal life
Adoor was born in Adoor, Pathanamthitta in Kerala, India on 24 May 1952 to N. Kunjuraman and V.M.Vilasini. He studied at the Sree Narayana College and Trivandrum Law Academy and graduated with a B.A. and L.L.B. He's married to Jayasree and the couple has three children.

Sources
 Parliament of India - Lok Sabha
 Kerala State - Everything about Kerala
 KERALA's FIRST LEGISLATIVE ASSEMBLY
 Information Public Relations Department - IPRD | I&PRD : Official Website of Information Public Relations Department of Kerala

References

1955 births
Living people
People from Pathanamthitta district
Indian National Congress politicians from Kerala
Kerala MLAs 1996–2001
Kerala MLAs 2006–2011
Kerala MLAs 2016–2021
India MPs 2019–present